Andrew Scott Coley (born 7 July 1978) is an English former professional rugby league footballer who played as a  and  forward in the 1990s, 2000s and 2010s. A Great Britain and England international forward, he played in the Super League for the Salford City Reds and the Wigan Warriors.

Career

Early career
Born in Warrington, Coley began playing rugby league for local amateur side Laporte ARL.

Swinton Lions
He turned professional in 1997, joining the Swinton Lions. 

In March 2000, Coley suffered a cruciate ligament injury, which ruled him out for the rest of the season.

Salford City Reds
In 2001, Coley signed for Salford City Reds as a  prior to the 2001's Super League VI, but subsequently moved up into the front row. Coley impressed in his first season at the club, and was rewarded with a new four-year contract. He required another knee operation at the end of the year, which ruled him out of the first few months of the 2002 season.

In 2004, Coley signed a new three-year contract with Salford.

Coley agreed a deal to join Wigan Warriors in September 2007 from Salford City Reds who were relegated in the 2007 Super League season.

Wigan Warriors
Coley was first team  at the Wigan Warriors since his arrival.

He played in the 2010 Super League Grand Final victory over St Helens at Old Trafford.

Coley played as a  forward in the 2011 Challenge Cup Final victory over the Leeds Rhinos at Wembley Stadium. Shortly before the final, Coley announced he would be retiring from rugby league at the end of the 2011 season.

Representative career
Coley's first representative honours came in 2001 when he represented Lancashire.

In 2004, he was selected for England during their victorious European Nations Cup campaign, scoring a hat trick of tries on his England début against Russia.

In 2006, he received his first call-up for Great Britain when he was selected for the 2006 Tri Nations. He appeared as a substitute in a warm-up game against Newcastle, but did not feature in any Test matches during the tournament. In June 2007, Coley won his first and only cap for Great Britain in a 42–14 win against France.

Post-playing career
Coley is a qualified quantity surveyor, and became Operations Director of a company in the construction industry.

References

External links
(archived by web.archive.org) Wigan Warriors profile
Statistics at wigan.rlfans.com

1978 births
Living people
England national rugby league team players
English rugby league players
Great Britain national rugby league team players
Lancashire rugby league team players
Rugby league players from Warrington
Rugby league props
Rugby league second-rows
Salford Red Devils players
Swinton Lions players
Wigan Warriors players